Yixin (11January 1833– 29May 1898), better known in English as PrinceKung or Gong, was an imperial prince of the Aisin Gioro clan and an important statesman of the Manchu-led Qing dynasty in China. He was a regent of the empire from 1861 to 1865 and wielded great influence at other times as well.

At a young age, Yixin was already noted for his brilliance and was once considered by his father the Daoguang Emperor as a potential heir. However, his older half-brother Yizhu eventually inherited the throne as the Xianfeng Emperor. During the Second Opium War in 1860, Prince Gong negotiated with the British, French and Russians, signing the Convention of Beijing on behalf of the Qing Empire. Following the death of the Xianfeng Emperor, Prince Gong launched the Xinyou Coup in 1861 with the aid of the Empress Dowagers Ci'an and Cixi and seized power from a group of eight regents appointed by the Xianfeng Emperor on his deathbed to assist his young son and successor, the Tongzhi Emperor. After the coup, he served as Prince-Regent from 1861 to 1865 and presided over the reforms implemented during the Tongzhi Restoration (1860–74). Despite his demotions in 1865 and 1874 for alleged corruption and disrespect towards the Emperor, Prince Gong continued to lead the Grand Council and remain a highly influential figure in the Qing government. The final decades of Prince Gong's career, under the reign of his nephew the Guangxu Emperor, were marred by his conflict with conservative elements in the Qing imperial court – In particular, his conflict with his former ally, Cixi, deepened his disillusionment with the court, and eventually opted to withdraw from politics and live in seclusion in the temple.

Having established in 1861 the Zongli Yamen, the Qing government's de facto foreign affairs ministry, Prince Gong is best remembered for advocating greater constructive engagement between the Qing Empire and the great powers of that era, as well as for his attempts to modernise China in the late 19th century. His former residence, "Prince Gong's Mansion", is now one of Beijing's few AAAAA-rated tourist attractions.

Names

Yixin is the pinyin romanisation of the Mandarin pronunciation of his Manchu name I-hin. He shared his surname Aisin Gioro with the other members of the Qing imperial family. His courtesy or art name was "Master of the Yuedao Hall" or "Hall of the Way of Music".

Kung is the Wade-Giles romanisation of Mandarin pronunciation of the same Chinese character , now spelt Gōng in pinyin. It is not really a name but a part of a descriptive title — "The Respectful Prince of the Blood" — previously borne by Changning, the fifth son of the Shunzhi Emperor. The Chinese title  translates literally as "king" but is usually understood as a "prince" in terms of the imperial Chinese nobility. Because Changning's rank had not been given "iron-cap" status, each generation of his descendants were reduced in rank unless they somehow proved themselves anew and earned a new title of their own. Yixin, however, was given "iron-cap" status and his direct heirs inherited his full title as well. In English, however, it is usually misunderstood as a name: PrinceKung in older sources and PrinceGong in newer ones. He was also sometimes known as the "Sixth Prince" or, less flatteringly, "Devil #6". He was posthumously known as "the Respectful and Loyal Prince of the Blood": Prince Kung-chung or Gongzhong.

Life

Early life
Yixin was born in the Aisin Gioro clan, the imperial clan of the Manchu-led Qing dynasty, as the sixth son of the Daoguang Emperor. He was the third son of his mother, Imperial Noble Consort Jing, who was from the Khorchin Mongol Borjigit clan. He studied in the imperial library and practised martial arts with his fourth brother, Yizhu. He created 28 qiang (spear) movements and 18 dao (sword) movements, which were respectively named "Lihua Xieli" (棣華協力) and "Bao'e Xuanwei" (寶鍔宣威) by his father. His father also gave him a White Rainbow Sword (白虹刀) as a gift.

Yixin was mentored by Zhuo Bingtian (卓秉恬) and Jia Zhen (賈楨), two eminent scholar-officials who obtained the position of jinshi (進士; successful candidate) in the imperial examination in 1802 and 1826 respectively.

In 1850, when the Daoguang Emperor became critically ill, he summoned Zaiquan (載銓), Zaiyuan, Duanhua, Sengge Rinchen, Mujangga, He Rulin (何汝霖), Chen Fu'en (陳孚恩) and Ji Zhichang (季芝昌) to Shende Hall (慎德堂) in the Old Summer Palace, where he revealed to them a secret edict he wrote previously. According to the edict, the Fourth Prince, Yizhu, would become the new emperor while Yixin, the Sixth Prince, would be made a qinwang (first-rank prince). He died on the same day. However, it is rumored that Yixin was the real successor emperor, and the secret decree have been tampered with.

Under the Xianfeng Emperor
Yizhu ascended the throne in 1850 after the death of the Daoguang Emperor and adopted the regnal title "Xianfeng"; he is thus historically known as the Xianfeng Emperor. In accordance with their father's secret edict, the newly enthroned Xianfeng Emperor granted Yixin the title "Prince Gong of the First Rank" (恭親王) in the same year. In 1851, the Xianfeng Emperor established an office for Prince Gong, gave him permission to enter the inner imperial court, assigned him to be in charge of patrol and defence matters, and ordered him to continue carrying the White Rainbow Sword given to him by their father.

In October 1853, as the Taiping rebels closed in on Jinan (畿南; the area south of the Hai River), Prince Gong was appointed to the Grand Council, which was in charge of military affairs. The following year, he received three additional appointments: dutong (都統; Banner Commander), you zongzheng (右宗正; Right Director of the Imperial Clan Court) and zongling (宗令; Head of the Imperial Clan Court). He was publicly praised in May 1855 after the Taiping rebels were driven out of Jinan.

When Prince Gong's mother died in August 1855, the Xianfeng Emperor reprimanded Prince Gong for failing to observe court protocol and removed him from the Grand Council and his zongling and dutong appointments. However, Prince Gong was still permitted to enter the inner imperial court and the imperial library. He was restored to his position as a dutong in June 1856, and further appointed as an Interior Minister (內大臣) in May 1859.

Second Opium War

In September 1860, during the Second Opium War, as the Anglo-French forces closed in on the capital Beijing, the Xianfeng Emperor ordered Zaiyuan and Muyin (穆廕) to negotiate for peace at Tongzhou with the enemy. The Anglo-French delegation, which included Harry Smith Parkes and Henry Loch, were taken prisoner by the Mongol general Sengge Rinchen during the negotiations. Sengge Rinchen then led his elite Mongol cavalry to attack the Anglo-French forces at the Battle of Baliqiao but was defeated. The Xianfeng Emperor recalled Zaiyuan and Muyin from Tongzhou, fled with most of his imperial court to Rehe Province, and appointed Prince Gong as an Imperial Commissioner with Discretion and Full Authority (欽差便宜行事全權大臣).

Prince Gong moved to Changxindian (長辛店; in present-day Fengtai District, Beijing) and called for an assembly of the troops stationed there to enforce greater discipline and raise their morale. On one hand, Qinghui (慶惠) suggested to the Xianfeng Emperor to release Harry Smith Parkes and let Prince Gong continue negotiating. On the other hand, Yidao (義道) urged the emperor to surrender Beijing to the enemy. In the meantime, the British and French looted and burnt down the Old Summer Palace in the northwest of Beijing.

On 24 October 1860, Prince Gong concluded the negotiations with the British, French and Russians, and signed the Convention of Beijing on behalf of the Qing Empire. He then wrote a memorial to the Xianfeng Emperor, requesting to be punished for signing the unequal treaty. The emperor replied, "The responsibility assigned to Prince Gong to carry on peace negotiations is not an easy one to shoulder. I deeply understand the difficult situation he was put into. There is no need to punish him." Prince Gong settled the diplomatic affairs in Beijing by the end of 1860.

In 1861, Prince Gong set up the Zongli Yamen, which functioned as the Qing government's de facto foreign affairs ministry, and placed Guiliang (桂良) and Wenxiang in charge of it. He wrote a memorial to the Xianfeng Emperor, proposing to enhance the training of Banner Troops in Beijing and let the Qing troops stationed in Jilin and Heilongjiang provinces train with the Russian Empire's forces and stockpile military supplies. The generals Shengbao (勝保), Jingchun (景淳) and others were ordered to train the troops in Beijing and northeast China.

Under the Tongzhi Emperor

Xinyou Coup
Before the Xianfeng Emperor died in August 1861 in the Chengde Mountain Resort, he appointed a group of eight regents – led by Zaiyuan, Duanhua and Sushun – to assist his underage son and successor, Zaichun. Yixin's flexible attitude towards dealing with the Western powers had put him at odds with the eight regents, who were politically conservative and opposed to Western influence. Upon request, Prince Gong was granted permission to travel to Chengde to attend the funeral. In Chengde, he met the Empress Dowagers Ci'an and Cixi and told them about how the eight regents monopolised state power. When the Xianfeng Emperor's coffin arrived back in Beijing in November 1861, Prince Gong and the two empress dowagers launched a coup – historically known as the Xinyou Coup (辛酉政變) – to oust the eight regents from power. The regents were arrested and removed from their positions of power.

As Prince-Regent
Zaichun, who was enthroned as the "Tongzhi Emperor", appointed Prince Gong as Prince-Regent (議政王) and granted him some special privileges. These privileges included: "iron-cap" status awarded to the Prince Gong title/peerage; an increment in salary to twice that of a normal qinwang (first-rank prince); exemptions from having to kowtow in the emperor's presence and having to write his name on memorials submitted to the emperor. Prince Gong firmly declined to accept the "iron-cap" privilege, and instead sought to be concurrently appointed as zongling (宗令; Head of the Imperial Clan Court) and put in charge of the Shenjiying (a firearms-equipped unit in the Qing army). The two empress dowagers also ordered Prince Gong to supervise Hongde Hall (弘德殿; a hall in the Forbidden City), where the Tongzhi Emperor studied.

In 1864, Qing forces finally suppressed the Taiping Rebellion after a war lasting more than a decade, and recaptured Jiangning (江寧; in present-day Nanjing) from the rebels. The imperial court issued a decree to praise Prince Gong for his effective leadership in the regency that led to the end of the rebellion – in addition to conferring more prestigious titles on his sons Zaicheng, Zaijun and Zaiying.

As the longstanding leader of the Zongli Yamen, which he established in 1861, Prince Gong was responsible for spearheading various reforms in the early stages of the Self-Strengthening Movement, a series of measures and policy changes implemented by the Qing government with the aim of modernising China. He also founded the Tongwen Guan in 1862 for Chinese scholars to study technology and foreign languages.

Fall from grace

Around April 1865, an official, Cai Shouqi (蔡壽祺), accused Prince Gong of "monopolising state power, accepting bribes, practising favouritism, behaving arrogantly, and showing disrespect towards the Emperor". The Empress Dowagers Ci'an and Cixi publicly reprimanded Prince Gong and stripped him of his position as Prince-Regent. Yishen (奕脤), Yixuan, Wang Zheng (王拯), Sun Yimou (孫翼謀), Yin Zhaoyong (殷兆鏞), Pan Zuyin, Wang Weizhen (王維珍), Guangcheng (廣誠) and others pleaded with the empress dowagers to pardon Prince Gong and make him Prince-Regent again. Although the empress dowagers did not restore Prince Gong as Prince-Regent, they permitted him to remain in the inner imperial court and continue running the Zongli Yamen. Prince Gong personally thanked the empress dowagers and made a tearful apology. The empress dowagers issued a decree announcing: "The Prince practised favouritism. As we are bound by a common cause and have high expectations of him, we cannot show leniency in punishing him. He will still be allowed to oversee the Grand Council."

In March 1868, as the Nian rebels approached the suburbs of Beijing, Prince Gong was tasked with mobilising troops and managing defence arrangements. He was also appointed as you zongzheng (右宗正; Right Director of the Imperial Clan Court).

In 1869, An Dehai, a court eunuch and close aide of Empress Dowager Cixi, was arrested and executed in Shandong Province by Ding Baozhen, the provincial governor. This was because it was a capital crime for eunuchs to travel out of the Forbidden City without authorisation. The empress dowager became more suspicious of Prince Gong because she believed that he instigated Ding Baozhen to execute An Dehai.

Demotion and restoration
In October 1872, when the Tongzhi Emperor married the Jiashun Empress, he granted Prince Gong the "iron-cap" privilege again. He officially took over the reins of power from his regents in around February 1873. In the same year, Prince Gong displeased Empress Dowager Cixi when he strongly opposed her plan to rebuild the Old Summer Palace.

In August 1874, Prince Gong was reprimanded and punished again for failing to observe court protocol. This time, he was demoted from a qinwang (first-rank prince) to a junwang (second-rank prince). Zaicheng, Prince Gong's eldest son, also lost his beile title. Despite his demotion, Prince Gong was still allowed to remain in the Grand Council. The following day, the empress dowagers ordered Prince Gong and Zaicheng to be restored as a qinwang and beile respectively. Towards the end of the year, the Tongzhi Emperor increased Prince Gong's salary by more than twice that of a normal qinwang, but died not long later in around December.

Under the Guangxu Emperor
The Guangxu Emperor, who succeeded the Tongzhi Emperor in 1875, continued the practices of exempting Prince Gong from having to kowtow in the emperor's presence and having to write his name on memorials submitted to the emperor. Prince Gong was also appointed as zongling (宗令; Head of the Imperial Clan Court).

Sino-French War

In 1884, when the French invaded Vietnam, Prince Gong and the members of the Grand Council were unable to arrive at a decision on whether or not to intervene in Vietnam and go to war with the French. As a consequence, Empress Dowager Cixi reprimanded Prince Gong and his colleagues for their dispirited and indecisive attitude towards the war, and removed them from their positions. Prince Gong stopped receiving his double salary and was ordered to retire to recuperate from illness. However, he started receiving his double salary again from November 1886 and was allowed to receive his share of the offerings from ceremonial events. He remained in Jietai Temple in western Beijing for most of the time.

Prince Gong's seventh brother, Yixuan (Prince Chun), replaced him as the head of the Grand Council. Some officials such as Baojun (寶鋆), Li Hongzao, Jinglian (景廉) and Weng Tonghe, who previously served in Prince Gong's administration, were also dismissed from office. The incident is known as the "Cabinet Change of Jiashen" (甲申易樞) or "Political Change of Jiashen" (甲申朝局之變) because it took place in the jiashen year according to the Chinese sexagenary cycle.

First Sino-Japanese War

In 1894, when the Japanese invaded Korea and the situation became dire, Empress Dowager Cixi summoned Prince Gong back to the imperial court, placed him in charge of the Zongli Yamen again, and tasked him with supervising the Beiyang Fleet (the Qing navy) and military affairs. Although Prince Gong had been recalled to politics, Empress Dowager Cixi also decreed that since he had not yet recovered from illness, he was exempted from having to constantly attend court sessions.

Death
In 1898, Prince Gong was appointed as zongling again, but he became critically ill by the end of April. Empress Dowager Cixi visited him thrice during this period of time. He eventually died at the age of 67 (by East Asian age reckoning) in May.

The Guangxu Emperor personally attended Prince Gong's funeral and, as a sign of mourning, cancelled imperial court sessions for five days and ordered mourning attire to be worn for 15 days. The emperor also granted Prince Gong the posthumous name "Zhong" (忠; literally "loyal"), gave him a place in the Imperial Ancestral Temple, and issued an edict honouring Prince Gong as a role model of loyalty that all Qing subjects should learn from.

Family 

Primary Consort

 Imperial Princess Consort Gongzhong, of the Gūwalgiya clan (恭忠亲王妃 瓜爾佳氏; 1834 – 29 June 1880)
 Princess Rongshou of the First Rank (榮壽固倫公主; 28 February 1854 – 24 December 1924), first daughter, later adopted by Empress Xiaoqinxian
 Married Zhiduan (志端; d. 1871) of the Manchu Fuca clan on 15 October 1866
 Zaicheng, Prince Guomin of the Third Rank (果敏貝勒 載澂; 12 September 1858 – 21 July 1885), first son
 Second daughter (15 March 1860 – 28 March 1864)
 Zaijun, Duke of the Second Rank (輔國公 載濬; 31 July 1864 – 6 June 1866), third son

Secondary Consort

 Secondary consort, of the Xuegiya clan (側福晉 薛佳氏)
 Zaiying, Prince of the Third Rank (貝勒 載瀅; 11 March 1861 – 29 September 1909), second son
 Secondary consort, of the Liugiya clan (側福晉 劉佳氏)
 Third daughter (6 March 1879 – 12 June 1880)
 Lady of the First Rank (郡君; 24 July 1884 – 6 March 1909), fifth daughter
 Secondary consort, of the Liugiya clan (側福晉 劉佳氏)
 Zaihuang, Duke of the Fourth Rank (不入八分輔國公 載潢; 11 November 1880 – 3 March 1885), fourth son
 Secondary consort, of the Janggiya clan (側福晉 張佳氏; 1858 – 4 October 1883)
 Fourth daughter (31 August 1881 – 8 September 1882)

Grandchildren

 First grandson Puwei 溥偉 , Prince Gong of the First Rank,  (1880-Died),
 Second grandson: PuRu 溥儒, (1896 - Died).
Third grandson: Puyou 溥佑, (1898- Died).
Fourth grandson: Puhui 溥僡(1896-Died).

Descendants

Puwei ‘s Family

 Yulin, 毓嶙  (1905,died ) 
 Yuyuan,毓岏  (1906,died )
 YuSong,毓崧  (1907,died)
 Yupan, 毓岎  (1909,died)
 Yanzhan 毓嶦 (1923,died)
 Yulv    毓嵂  (1926,died ) 
 Yurong  毓嶸v(1930, died)
 Yuyong, 毓嵱 (1932, died)
 Hengshou 恆铄(Hakesh)
 Hengyan  恆鋺 (Jasmine)
 Hengqian 恆鈐(Cherry) 
 Hengqin  恆欽(Cecilia) 
 Qisong   啟鬆 (Jinon)
 Qining   啟寧 (jinin)

PuRu’s Family

Yuli       毓岦

Yucen  毓岑

PuYou's Family

Yujunyan 毓君彥

QiHui 啟芸 (Jinun)

PuHui's  Family

Yuhuan 毓峘

Qiyuan 啟芫(Jinan)

Qien 啟恩(Jinen)

Ancestry

Legacy

Prince Gong's former residence in Xicheng District, Beijing is now open to the public as a museum and garden park. It was previously the residence of the notoriously corrupt official Heshen.

In 2006, Prince Gong's life was adapted into a Chinese television series, Sigh of His Highness, starring Chen Baoguo as the prince.

See also
 Royal and noble ranks of the Qing dynasty

References

Citations

Bibliography
 
 
 

1833 births
1898 deaths
19th-century Chinese people
19th-century viceregal rulers
Grand Councillors of the Qing dynasty
Manchu Bordered Blue Bannermen
Manchu politicians
People of the Second Opium War
Daoguang Emperor's sons
Qing dynasty politicians from Beijing
Qing dynasty regents
Ministers of Zongli Yamen
Prince Gong
Chinese reformers